Pop is a city in Namangan Region, Uzbekistan. It is the administrative center of Pop District. Its population is 26,900 (2016). At Pop, the Angren–Pop railway line (opened in 2016) joins the line from Kokand to Namangan.

Number of secondary scholls — six (6): № 1, № 8, № 23,№ 37, № 40, № 65, № 67.

Number of secondary special educational institutions — three (3): boarding school № 11, Medical college, Business college.

Pop town consists of 14 district-units: 
 Kelachi
 Khamza
 Shomazor
 Olmazor
 Obod
 Tinchlik
 Khazrati bob
 Uzbekistan
 Ipak Yuli
 Dustlik
 Pakhtakor
 Alisher Navoi
 Khamid Olimjon
 Abdulla Kakhhar

References

Populated places in Namangan Region
Cities in Uzbekistan